Karl Julius Christian Adalbert Heinrich Ferdinand von Koseritz, known simply as Karl von Koseritz (1834 in Dessau – 1890 in Porto Alegre) was a German-Brazilian journalist, writer, teacher, playwright and politician. He fought in the First Schleswig War as a soldier, before moving to Brazil. After arriving in 1851, he established himself in Pelotas in the province of Rio Grande do Sul. He worked as a cook, painter and bookkeeper before becoming a journalist. In 1856 he married a Brazilian woman and changed his first name to Carlos. In 1886, already living in Porto Alegre, he became editor of "A Reforma", the Liberal Party's official newspaper, which headed the abolitionist campaign in the province. He continued a monarchist until his death, and was seen as an important person in the German colonies of Rio Grande do Sul.

See also 

 Sociedade Partenon Literário

External links

References

1834 births
1890 deaths
People from Dessau-Roßlau
People from Porto Alegre
Brazilian journalists
Male journalists
German emigrants to Brazil